The Numatina Game Reserve is a protected area in South Sudan. The  savannah woodland habitat is home to species including elephant, giant eland, and roan antelope.

There are three named mountains in Numatina Game Reserve. The highest and the most prominent mountain is Jabal Nbiripiri.

References

Game reserves of South Sudan